Clathrina multiformis is a species of calcareous sponge from Russia.

References

Clathrina
Animals described in 1898
Fauna of Russia